Steven Reid (born July 27, 1936) is an American professional golfer who played on the PGA Tour and the Senior PGA Tour.

Reid was born in Santa Barbara, California. Reid defeated Gary Player on the second extra hole in a playoff at the 1968 Azalea Open Invitational for his first and only PGA Tour win. His best finish in a major was T-26 at the 1968 PGA Championship.

Professional wins (1)

PGA Tour wins (1)

PGA Tour playoff record (1–0)

References

External links

American male golfers
PGA Tour golfers
PGA Tour Champions golfers
Golfers from California
Sportspeople from Santa Barbara, California
People from Rutherfordton, North Carolina
1936 births
Living people